Shaw Media is a newspaper publisher based in Crystal Lake, Illinois, a suburb of Chicago. Its portfolio includes about 80 newspapers and news websites in Illinois and Iowa. Originally based in Dixon, Illinois; it has acquired a swath of properties in the Chicago suburbs and moved its headquarters there. Founded in 1851, Shaw Media is the third oldest, continuously owned and operated family newspaper company in the nation.

Acquisitions
In 2012, Shaw Media acquired Suburban Life Publications, a group of weeklies in Chicago's western suburbs, from GateHouse Media.

In 2013, Sun-Times Media sold The Herald-News of Joliet to Shaw Media.

In 2023, Shaw Media acquired Studstill Media in Peru, Illinois and their eight radio stations (WALS, WBZG, WGLC-FM, WIVQ, WSPL, WSTQ (FM), and WYYS) for $1.8 million. The sale marked Shaw Media's launch into radio and digital media, whereas previously, they exclusively owned newspapers.

Other properties
Shaw Media and the Daily Herald announced in spring 2014 the launch of a new Chicago Football magazine led by veteran football analyst Hub Arkush. The magazine subsequently merged with the re-launched Pro Football Weekly.

On December 18, 2020 they launched Shaw Local, a digital news platform covering northern Illinois.

References

External links
 
Chicago Football magazine website

1851 establishments in Illinois
Companies based in Lee County, Illinois
Dixon, Illinois
Newspaper companies of the United States
Publishing companies established in 1851